

Events

Pre-1600
 303 – Roman emperor Diocletian orders the destruction of the Christian church in Nicomedia, beginning eight years of Diocletianic Persecution.
 532 – Byzantine emperor Justinian I lays the foundation stone of a new Orthodox Christian basilica in Constantinople – the Hagia Sophia.
 628 – Khosrow II, last Sasanian shah of Iran, is overthrown.
 705 – Empress Wu Zetian abdicates the throne, restoring the Tang dynasty.
1455 – Traditionally the date of publication of the Gutenberg Bible, the first Western book printed with movable type.

1601–1900
1763 – Berbice slave uprising in Guyana: The first major slave revolt in South America.
1778 – American Revolutionary War: Baron von Steuben arrives at Valley Forge, Pennsylvania, to help train the Continental Army.
1820 – Cato Street Conspiracy: A plot to murder all the British cabinet ministers is exposed and the conspirators arrested.
1836 – Texas Revolution: The Siege of the Alamo (prelude to the Battle of the Alamo) begins in San Antonio, Texas.
1847 – Mexican–American War: Battle of Buena Vista: In Mexico, American troops under future president General Zachary Taylor defeat Mexican General Antonio López de Santa Anna.
1854 – The official independence of the Orange Free State, South Africa is declared.
1861 – President-elect Abraham Lincoln arrives secretly in Washington, D.C., after the thwarting of an alleged assassination plot in Baltimore, Maryland.
1870 – Reconstruction Era: Post-U.S. Civil War military control of Mississippi ends and it is readmitted to the Union.
1883 – Alabama becomes the first U.S. state to enact an anti-trust law.
1885 – Sino-French War: French Army gains an important victory in the Battle of Đồng Đăng in the Tonkin region of Vietnam.
1886 – Charles Martin Hall produced the first samples of aluminium from the electrolysis of aluminium oxide, after several years of intensive work. He was assisted in this project by his older sister, Julia Brainerd Hall.
1887 – The French Riviera is hit by a large earthquake, killing around 2,000.
1898 – Émile Zola is imprisoned in France after writing J'Accuse…!, a letter accusing the French government of antisemitism and wrongfully imprisoning Captain Alfred Dreyfus.
1900 – Second Boer War: During the Battle of the Tugela Heights, the first British attempt to take Hart's Hill fails.

1901–present
1903 – Cuba leases Guantánamo Bay to the United States "in perpetuity".
1905 – Chicago attorney Paul Harris and three other businessmen meet for lunch to form the Rotary Club, the world's first service club.
1909 – The AEA Silver Dart makes the first powered flight in Canada and the British Empire.
1917 – First demonstrations in Saint Petersburg, Russia. The beginning of the February Revolution (March 8 in the Gregorian calendar).
1927 – U.S. President Calvin Coolidge signs a bill by Congress establishing the Federal Radio Commission (later replaced by the Federal Communications Commission) which was to regulate the use of radio frequencies in the United States.
  1927   – German theoretical physicist Werner Heisenberg writes a letter to fellow physicist Wolfgang Pauli, in which he describes his uncertainty principle for the first time.
1934 – Leopold III becomes King of Belgium.
1941 – Plutonium is first produced and isolated by Dr. Glenn T. Seaborg.
1942 – World War II: Japanese submarines fire artillery shells at the coastline near Santa Barbara, California.
1943 – The Cavan Orphanage fire kills thirty-five girls and an elderly cook.
  1943   – Greek Resistance: The United Panhellenic Organization of Youth is founded in Greece.
1944 – The Soviet Union begins the forced deportation of the Chechen and Ingush people from the North Caucasus to Central Asia.
1945 – World War II: During the Battle of Iwo Jima, a group of United States Marines reach the top of Mount Suribachi on the island and are photographed raising the American flag.
  1945   – World War II: The 11th Airborne Division, with Filipino guerrillas, free all 2,147 captives of the Los Baños internment camp, in what General Colin Powell later would refer to as "the textbook airborne operation for all ages and all armies."
  1945   – World War II: The capital of the Philippines, Manila, is liberated by combined Filipino and American forces.
  1945   – World War II: Capitulation of German garrison in Poznań. The city is liberated by Soviet and Polish forces.
  1945   – World War II: The German town of Pforzheim is annihilated in a raid by 379 British bombers.
1947 – International Organization for Standardization is founded.
1954 – The first mass inoculation of children against polio with the Salk vaccine begins in Pittsburgh.
1958 – Five-time Argentine Formula One champion Juan Manuel Fangio is kidnapped by rebels involved in the Cuban Revolution, on the eve of the Cuban Grand Prix. He was released the following day after the race.
1966 – In Syria, Ba'ath Party member Salah Jadid leads an intra-party military coup that replaces the previous government of General Amin al-Hafiz, also a Baathist.
1971 – Operation Lam Son 719: South Vietnamese General Do Cao Tri was killed in a helicopter crash en route to taking control of the faltering campaign.
1974 – The Symbionese Liberation Army demands $4 million more to release kidnap victim Patty Hearst.
1980 – Iran hostage crisis: Supreme Leader Ayatollah Ruhollah Khomeini states that Iran's parliament will decide the fate of the American embassy hostages.
1981 – In Spain, Antonio Tejero attempts a coup d'état by capturing the Spanish Congress of Deputies.
1983 – The United States Environmental Protection Agency announces its intent to buy out and evacuate the dioxin-contaminated community of Times Beach, Missouri.
1987 – Supernova 1987a is seen in the Large Magellanic Cloud.
1988 – Saddam Hussein begins the Anfal genocide against Kurds and Assyrians in northern Iraq.
1991 – In Thailand, General Sunthorn Kongsompong leads a bloodless coup d'état, deposing Prime Minister Chatichai Choonhavan.
1998 – In the United States, tornadoes in central Florida destroy or damage 2,600 structures and kill 42 people.
1999 – Kurdish rebel leader Abdullah Öcalan is charged with treason in Ankara, Turkey.
  1999   – An avalanche buries the town of Galtür, Austria, killing 31.
2007 – A train derails on an evening express service near Grayrigg, Cumbria, England, killing one person and injuring 88. This results in hundreds of points being checked over the UK after a few similar accidents.
2008 – A United States Air Force B-2 Spirit bomber crashes on Guam, marking  the first operational loss of a B-2.
2010 – Unknown criminals pour more than  million liters of diesel oil and other hydrocarbons into the river Lambro, in northern Italy, sparking an environmental disaster.
2012 – A series of attacks across Iraq leave at least 83 killed and more than 250 injured.
2017 – The Turkish-backed Free Syrian Army captures Al-Bab from ISIL.
2019 – Atlas Air Flight 3591, a Boeing 767 freighter, crashes into Trinity Bay near Anahuac, Texas, killing all three people on board.
2020 – Ahmaud Arbery, a 25-year-old African-American citizen, is shot and murdered by three white men after visiting a house under construction while jogging at a neighborhood in Satilla Shores near Brunswick in Glynn County, Georgia.
2021 – Four simultaneous prison riots leave at least 62 people dead in Ecuador.

Births

Pre-1600
1133 – Al-Zafir, Fatimid caliph (d. 1154)
1417 – Pope Paul II (d. 1471)
  1417   – Louis IX, Duke of Bavaria (d. 1479)
1443 – Matthias Corvinus, Hungarian king (d. 1490)
1529 – Onofrio Panvinio, Italian historian (d. 1568)
1539 – Henry XI of Legnica, thrice Duke of Legnica (d. 1588)
  1539   – Salima Sultan Begum, Empress of the Mughal Empire (d. 1612)
1583 – Jean-Baptiste Morin, French mathematician, astrologer, and astronomer (d. 1656)
1592 – Balthazar Gerbier, Dutch painter (d. 1663)

1601–1900
1606 – George Frederick of Nassau-Siegen, officer in the Dutch Army (d. 1674)
1633 – Samuel Pepys, English diarist and politician (d. 1703)
1646 – Tokugawa Tsunayoshi, Japanese shōgun (d. 1709)
1680 – Jean-Baptiste Le Moyne, Sieur de Bienville, Canadian politician, 2nd Colonial Governor of Louisiana (d. 1767)
1685 – George Frideric Handel, German-English organist and composer (d. 1759)
1723 – Richard Price, Welsh-English minister and philosopher (d. 1791)
1744 – Mayer Amschel Rothschild, German banker and businessman (d. 1812)
1792 – José Joaquín de Herrera, Mexican politician and general (d. 1854)
1805 – Johan Jakob Nervander, Finnish poet, physicist and meteorologist (d. 1848)
1831 – Hendrik Willem Mesdag, Dutch painter (d. 1915)
1842 – Karl Robert Eduard von Hartmann, German philosopher and author (d. 1906)
1850 – César Ritz, Swiss businessman, founded The Ritz Hotel, London and Hôtel Ritz Paris (d. 1918)
1868 – W. E. B. Du Bois, American sociologist, historian, and activist (d. 1963)
  1868   – Anna Hofman-Uddgren, Swedish actress, singer, and director (d. 1947)
1873 – Liang Qichao, Chinese journalist, philosopher, and scholar (d. 1929)
1874 – Konstantin Päts, Estonian lawyer and politician, 1st President of Estonia (d. 1956)
1878 – Kazimir Malevich, Ukrainian painter and theorist (d. 1935)
1883 – Karl Jaspers, German-Swiss psychiatrist and philosopher (d. 1969)
  1883   – Guy C. Wiggins, American painter (d. 1962)
1889 – Musidora, French actress and director (d. 1957)
  1889   – Cyril Delevanti, English-American actor (d. 1975)
  1889   – Victor Fleming, American director, cinematographer, and producer (d. 1949)
  1889   – John Gilbert Winant, American captain, pilot, and politician, 60th Governor of New Hampshire (d. 1947)
1892 – Kathleen Harrison, English actress (d. 1995)
  1892   – Agnes Smedley, American journalist and writer (d. 1950)
1894 – Harold Horder, Australian rugby league player and coach (d. 1978)
1899 – Erich Kästner, German author and poet (d. 1974)
  1899   – Norman Taurog, American director and screenwriter (d. 1981)

1901–present
1904 – Terence Fisher, English director and screenwriter (d. 1980)
  1904   – William L. Shirer, American journalist and historian (d. 1993)
1908 – William McMahon, Australian lawyer and politician, 20th Prime Minister of Australia (d. 1988)
1915 – Jon Hall, American actor and director (d. 1979)
  1915   – Paul Tibbets, American general and pilot (d. 2007)
1919 – Johnny Carey, Irish footballer and manager (d. 1995)
1920 – Paul Gérin-Lajoie, Canadian lawyer and politician (d. 2018)
1923 – Rafael Addiego Bruno, Uruguayan jurist and politician, President of Uruguay (d. 2014)
  1923   – Harry Clarke, English international footballer (d. 2000)
  1923   – Ioannis Grivas, Greek judge and politician, 176th Prime Minister of Greece (d. 2016)
  1923   – Dante Lavelli, American football player (d. 2009)
  1923   – Clarence D. Lester, African-American fighter pilot (d.1986)
  1923   – Mary Francis Shura, American author (d. 1991)
1924 – Allan McLeod Cormack, South-African-American physicist and academic, Nobel Prize laureate (d. 1998)
1925 – Louis Stokes, American lawyer and politician (d. 2015)
1927 – Régine Crespin, French soprano and actress (d. 2007)
  1927   – Jessica Huntley, Guyanese activist and publisher (d. 2013)
1928 – Hans Herrmann, German racing driver
  1928   – Vasily Lazarev, Russian colonel, physician, and astronaut (d. 1990)
1929 – Patriarch Alexy II of Moscow (d. 2008)
  1929   – Elston Howard, American baseball player and coach (d. 1980)
1930 – Paul West, English-American author, poet, and academic (d. 2015)
1931 – Tom Wesselmann, American painter and sculptor (d. 2004)
1932 – Majel Barrett, American actress and producer (d. 2008)
1937 – Tom Osborne, American football player, coach, and politician
1938 – Sylvia Chase, American broadcast journalist (d. 2019)
  1938   – Paul Morrissey, American director, producer, and screenwriter
  1938   – Diane Varsi, American actress (d. 1992)
1940 – Peter Fonda, American actor, director, producer, and screenwriter (d. 2019)
  1940   – Jackie Smith, American football player
1941 – Ron Hunt, American baseball player
1943 – Fred Biletnikoff, American football player and coach
  1943   – Bobby Mitchell, American golfer (d. 2018)
1944 – Bernard Cornwell, English author and educator
  1944   – Florian Fricke, German keyboard player and composer (d. 2001)
  1944   – Johnny Winter, American singer-songwriter, guitarist, and producer (d. 2014)
1945 – Allan Boesak, South African cleric and politician
1946 – Rusty Young, American singer-songwriter and guitarist (d. 2021)
1947 – Pia Kjærsgaard, Danish politician, Speaker of the Danish Parliament
  1947   – Anton Mosimann, Swiss chef and author
1948 – Bill Alexander, English director and producer
  1948   – Trevor Cherry, English footballer (d. 2020)
  1948   – Steve Priest, English singer-songwriter and bass player (d. 2020)
1949 – César Aira, Argentinian author and translator
  1949   – Marc Garneau, Canadian engineer, astronaut, and politician
1950 – Rebecca Goldstein, American philosopher and author
  1950   – John Greaves, British bass guitarist and composer
1951 – Eddie Dibbs, American tennis player
  1951   – Debbie Friedman, American singer-songwriter of Jewish melodies (d. 2011)
  1951   – Ed "Too Tall" Jones, American football player and boxer
  1951   – Patricia Richardson, American actress
1952 – Brad Whitford, American guitarist and songwriter
1953 – Kenny Bee, Hong Kong singer-songwriter, guitarist, and actor
  1953   – Satoru Nakajima, Japanese racing driver
1954 – Rajini Thiranagama, Sri Lankan physician and academic (d. 1989)
  1954   – Viktor Yushchenko, Ukrainian captain and politician, 3rd President of Ukraine
1955 – Howard Jones, English singer-songwriter
  1955   – Flip Saunders, American basketball player and coach (d. 2015)
1956 – Sandra Osborne, Scottish politician
1958 – David Sylvian, English singer-songwriter
1959 – Clayton Anderson, American engineer and astronaut
  1959   – Nick de Bois, English politician
  1959   – Ian Liddell-Grainger, Scottish soldier and politician
  1959   – Linda Nolan, Irish singer and actress
1960 – Naruhito, Emperor of Japan
1962 – Michael Wilton, American guitarist
1963 – Bobby Bonilla, American baseball player
  1963   – Radosław Sikorski, Polish journalist and politician, 11th Minister of Foreign Affairs of Poland
1964 – John Norum, Norwegian guitarist and songwriter
1965 – Michael Dell, American businessman
  1965   – Helena Suková, Czech-Monacan tennis player
1967 – Steve Stricker, American golfer
  1967   – Chris Vrenna, American drummer, songwriter, and producer
1969 – Michael Campbell, New Zealand golfer
  1969   – Martine Croxall, English journalist and television news presenter
  1969   – Daymond John, American fashion designer and businessman, founded FUBU
1970 – Niecy Nash, American actress and producer
1971 – Carin Koch, Swedish golfer
  1971   – Melinda Messenger, English model and television host
  1971   – Joe-Max Moore, American soccer player
1972 – Alessandro Sturba, Italian footballer
  1972   – Rondell White, American baseball player
1973 – Jeff Nordgaard, American-Polish basketball player
1974 – Herschelle Gibbs, South African cricketer
  1974   – Robbi Kempson, South African rugby player
1975 – Michael Cornacchia, American actor, director, producer, and screenwriter
1976 – Kelly Macdonald, Scottish actress
1977 – Kristina Šmigun-Vähi, Estonian skier
1978 – John Manning, Australian rugby league player and actor
  1978   – Residente, Puerto Rican-American singer-songwriter
  1978   – Dan Snyder, Canadian ice hockey player (d. 2003)
1981 – Gareth Barry, English footballer
  1981   – Josh Gad, American actor, producer, and screenwriter
1983 – Mido, Egyptian footballer, manager and sportscaster
  1983   – Aziz Ansari, American comedian, actor, producer, and screenwriter
  1983   – Emily Blunt, English actress
1986 – Emerson Conceição, Brazilian footballer
  1986   – Skylar Grey, American singer-songwriter
  1986   – Kazuya Kamenashi, Japanese singer-songwriter and actor
  1986   – Jerod Mayo, American football player
  1986   – Ola Svensson, Swedish singer-songwriter
1987 – Ab-Soul, American rapper
  1987   – Theophilus London, Trinidadian-American singer-songwriter and producer
  1987   – Zak Kirkup, Member of the Parliament of Western Australia
1988 – Nicolás Gaitán, Argentinian footballer
1989 – Evan Bates, American ice dancer
  1989   – Jérémy Pied, French footballer
1990 – Kevin Connauton, Canadian ice hockey player
  1990   – Marco Scandella, Canadian ice hockey player
1992 – Casemiro, Brazilian footballer
  1992   – Kyriakos Papadopoulos, Greek footballer
1993 – Chris Grevsmuhl, Australian rugby league player
1994 – Dakota Fanning, American actress
1995 – Andrew Wiggins, Canadian basketball player
1996 – D'Angelo Russell, American basketball player
1997 – Jamal Murray, Canadian basketball player

Deaths

Pre-1600
 715 – Al-Walid I, Umayyad caliph (b. 668)
 908 – Li Keyong, Shatuo military governor during the Tang Dynasty in China (b. 856)
 943 – Herbert II, Count of Vermandois, (b. 884)
   943   – David I, prince of Tao-Klarjeti (Georgia)
1011 – Willigis, German archbishop (b. 940)
1100 – Emperor Zhezong of Song (b. 1076)
1270 – Isabel of France (b. 1225)
1447 – Humphrey, Duke of Gloucester (b. 1390)
  1447   – Pope Eugene IV (b. 1383)
1464 – Emperor Yingzong of Ming (b. 1427)
1473 – Arnold, Duke of Gelderland (b. 1410)
1526 – Diego Colón, Spanish Viceroy of the Indies (b. c. 1479)
1554 – Henry Grey, 1st Duke of Suffolk, English politician, Lord Lieutenant of Leicestershire (b. 1515)

1601–1900
1603 – Andrea Cesalpino, Italian philosopher, physician, and botanist (b. 1519)
  1603   – Franciscus Vieta, French mathematician (b. 1540)
1620 – Nicholas Fuller, English politician (b. 1543)
1704 – Georg Muffat, French organist and composer (b. 1653)
1766 – Stanisław Leszczyński, Polish king (b. 1677)
1781 – George Taylor, Founding Father of the United States (b. 1716)
1792 – Joshua Reynolds, English painter and academic (b. 1723)
1821 – John Keats, English poet (b. 1795)
1844 – Martim Francisco Ribeiro de Andrada, Brazilian politician, twice Minister of Finance, brother of José Bonifácio (b. 1775)
1848 – John Quincy Adams, American politician, 6th President of the United States (b. 1767)
1855 – Carl Friedrich Gauss, German mathematician, astronomer, and physicist (b. 1777)
1859 – Zygmunt Krasiński, Polish poet and playwright (b. 1812)
1871 – Amanda Cajander, Finnish medical reformer (b. 1827)
1879 – Albrecht von Roon, Prussian soldier and politician, 10th Minister President of Prussia (b. 1803)
1897 – Woldemar Bargiel, German composer and educator (b. 1828)
1900 – Ernest Dowson, English poet, novelist, and short story writer (b. 1867)

1901–present
1908 – Friedrich von Esmarch, German surgeon and academic (b. 1823)
1918 – Adolphus Frederick VI, Grand Duke of Mecklenburg-Strelitz (b. 1882)
1930 – Horst Wessel, German SA officer (b. 1907)
1931 – Nellie Melba, Australian soprano and actress (b. 1861)
1934 – Edward Elgar, English composer and academic (b. 1857)
1944 – Leo Baekeland, Belgian-American chemist and engineer (b. 1863)
1946 – Tomoyuki Yamashita, Japanese general (b. 1885)
1948 – John Robert Gregg, Irish-American publisher and educator (b. 1866)
1955 – Paul Claudel, French poet and playwright (b. 1868)
1965 – Stan Laurel, English actor and comedian (b. 1890)
1969 – Madhubala, Indian actress and producer (b. 1933)
  1969   – Saud bin Abdulaziz Al Saud, 2nd King of Saudi Arabia (b. 1902)
1973 – Dickinson W. Richards, American physician and physiologist, Nobel Prize laureate (b. 1895)
1974 – Harry Ruby, American composer and screenwriter (b. 1895)
1976 – L. S. Lowry, English painter (b. 1887)
1979 – W. A. C. Bennett, Canadian businessman and politician, 25th Premier of British Columbia (b. 1900)
1983 – Herbert Howells, English organist and composer (b. 1892)
1990 – José Napoleón Duarte, Salvadoran engineer and politician, President of El Salvador (b. 1925)
1995 – James Herriot, English veterinarian and author (b. 1916)
1997 – Tony Williams, American drummer, composer, and producer (b. 1945)
1998 – Philip Abbott, American actor and director (b. 1924)
1999 – The Renegade, American wrestler (b. 1965)
2000 – Ofra Haza, Israeli singer-songwriter and actress (b. 1957)
  2000   – Stanley Matthews, English footballer and manager (b. 1915)
2003 – Howie Epstein, American bass player, songwriter, and producer (b. 1955)
  2003   – Robert K. Merton, American sociologist and academic (b. 1910)
2004 – Vijay Anand, Indian director, producer, screenwriter, and actor (b. 1934)
  2004   – Sikander Bakht, Indian politician, Indian Minister of External Affairs (b. 1918)
2006 – Muhammad Shamsul Huq, Bangladeshi academic and former Minister of Foreign Affairs (b. 1912)
  2006   – Telmo Zarra, Spanish footballer (b. 1921)
2007 – John Ritchie, English footballer (b. 1941)
2008 – Janez Drnovšek, Slovenian economist and politician, 2nd President of Slovenia (b. 1950)
  2008   – Paul Frère, Belgian racing driver and journalist (b. 1917)
2010 – Orlando Zapata, Cuban plumber and activist (b. 1967)
2011 – Nirmala Srivastava, Indian religious leader, founded Sahaja Yoga (b. 1923)
2012 – William Raggio, American lawyer and politician (b. 1926)
  2012   – David Sayre, American physicist and mathematician (b. 1924)
  2012   – Kazimierz Żygulski, Polish sociologist and activist (b. 1919)
2013 – Eugene Bookhammer, American soldier and politician, 18th Lieutenant Governor of Delaware (b. 1918)
  2013   – Joseph Friedenson, Holocaust survivor, Holocaust historian, Yiddish writer, lecturer and editor (b. 1922)
  2013   – Julien Ries, Belgian cardinal (b. 1920)
  2013   – Lotika Sarkar, Indian lawyer and academic (b. 1945)
2014 – Alice Herz-Sommer, Czech-English Holocaust survivor, pianist and educator (b. 1903)
  2014   – Roger Hilsman, American soldier, academic, and politician (b. 1919)
2015 – James Aldridge, Australian-English journalist and author (b. 1918)
  2015   – Rana Bhagwandas, Pakistani lawyer and judge, Chief Justice of Pakistan (b. 1942)
  2015   – W. E. "Bill" Dykes, American soldier and politician (b. 1925)
2016 – Peter Lustig, German television host and author (b. 1937)
  2016   – Jacqueline Mattson, American baseball player (b. 1928)
2019 – Katherine Helmond, American actress (b. 1929)
2021 – Ahmed Zaki Yamani, Saudi Arabian politician (b. 1930)
2023 – Tony Earl, American politician, 40th Governor of Wisconsin (b. 1936)
  2023   – John Motson, English football commentator (b. 1945)

Holidays and observances
Christian feast day:
Polycarp of Smyrna
Serenus the Gardener
February 23 (Eastern Orthodox liturgics)
The Emperor's Birthday, birthday of Naruhito, the current Emperor of Japan (Japan)
Mashramani-Republic Day (Guyana)
National Day (Brunei)
Red Army Day or Day of Soviet Army and Navy in the former Soviet Union, also held in various former Soviet republics:
Defender of the Fatherland Day (Russia)
Defender of the Fatherland and Armed Forces day (Belarus)
Armed Forces Day (Tajikistan) (Tajikistan)

References

External links

 BBC: On This Day
 
 Historical Events on February 23

Days of the year
February